The Gramercy Residences, also known as The Gramercy Residences at Century City, is a residential high-rise condominium in Makati, Philippines. As of 2023, it is the fourth tallest building in the Philippines together with Discovery Primea and Shangri-La at the Fort, Manila. It is the first of several buildings built at the new Century City complex along Kalayaan Avenue by the Century City Development Corporation.

The building takes its name from Gramercy Park, a fenced-in private park in one of Manhattan, New York City's prestigious neighborhoods.

Location
The Gramercy Residences is located within the former location of the 4.8-hectare International School Manila, of which 3.4 hectares was sold to Century Properties Corporation (the remaining was sold to Picar Development) in an auction by the Philippine government in 2007. Situated along Kalayaan Avenue in Makati Poblacion, it is just a block away from the busy entertainment area along Makati Avenue. It is also about a few blocks away from the Makati Central Business District, the capital's financial hub.

Architecture and construction

The Gramercy Residences was planned and designed by California-based architectural group Jerde Partnership International, in collaboration with Philippine architectural firm Roger Villarosa Architects & Associates. Structural design and engineering is provided by Hong Kong-based firm Ove Arup & Partners and Sy^2 + Associates Inc. Project and construction management is being handled by local firm Nova Construction + Development.

Feature
The main attraction of the building is its Skypark. Located on the 36th floor, it has three-storey waterfalls, multi-level infinity edge pools, lagoon pools, a designer restaurant, health club, café, spa, a garden island within a reflecting pool, and a cantilevering walkway — a pathway suspended in mid-air with infinity pools on one side and a glass handrail on the outside. The Skypark traverses the entire width of the building. There is also a Rooftop Bar/ Restaurant located on the 71st floor, named 71 Gramercy.

See also
 List of tallest buildings in the Philippines

References

External links
Official Website
Official Website of the Century City
Official Website of Century Properties
Gramercy Residences Condominium Other Details

Skyscrapers in Makati
Residential skyscrapers in Metro Manila
Residential buildings completed in 2013